Cineworld Dublin is the biggest cinema in Ireland, with 4 floors and 17 screens. It is located on Parnell Street, Dublin and is owned by the Cineworld cinema chain.

It was opened by Virgin Cinemas in 1995 as Virgin Cinemas Dublin, the only cinema that was opened by Virgin Cinemas in Ireland.

In 1999, the Virgin Group sold Virgin Cinemas to French cinema chain, UGC. All Virgin Cinemas were rebranded as UGC and Virgin Cinemas Dublin was renamed UGC Dublin in 1999.

The current front entrance was originally opened as a separate IMAX 70mm cinema in about 1998. It was bought by the UGC cinema next door and converted into UGC's replacement front entrance. The one IMAX screen was converted into 5+ extra cinemas (to add to UGC's existing screens), a bar, shop, and ticketing area. In 2012 screen 17 on the top floor was refurbished to support digital IMAX (smaller, lower resolution than 70mm IMAX film). It is considerably smaller in size than the original IMAX screen housed by the building.

In 2004, UGC's UK and Ireland operations were taken over by Cineworld. In 2005, the UGC cinemas in the UK and Ireland were rebranded as Cineworld. UGC Dublin was renamed Cineworld Dublin.

References

External links
 Cineworld Dublin

Cinemas in Dublin (city)